The Underachievers is a 1987 American comedy film directed by Jackie Kong.

Premise
A narcotics officer goes undercover as a student at an adult night school to locate a drug ring.

References

External links

1987 films
American comedy films
1987 comedy films
1980s English-language films
Films directed by Jackie Kong
1980s American films